"We Thuggin'" is a single by American rapper Fat Joe featuring American singer R. Kelly. It is a single from Fat Joe's 2001 album Jealous Ones Still Envy (J.O.S.E.).

The official remix was also included in the album and features R. Kelly, Busta Rhymes, N.O.R.E. a.k.a. Noreaga and Remy Ma.

Music video
The music video is directed by Bille Woodruff. It includes an appearance from DJ Khaled.

Charts

Weekly charts

Year-end charts

References

External links
Music video at MTV.com

2001 singles
2001 songs
Fat Joe songs
R. Kelly songs
Atlantic Records singles
Songs written by R. Kelly
Song recordings produced by R. Kelly
Songs written by Fat Joe